Oktyabrina Vladimirovna Voronova (  Matryokhina,  Матрёхина, 5 October 1934 Chalmny-Varre, Murmansk Okrug, USSR – 16 June 1990, Revda, Murmansk Oblast, USSR) was the first Soviet poet of Sámi origin to write a poetry collection in a Sámi language in Russia. Voronova wrote in both Russian and Ter Sámi. She was living in Revda at the time of her death.

Early life and education 
Matryokhina was born on 5 October 1934 in the village of Chalmny-Varre, Murmansk Okrug, USSR, the eldest of six children born into the reindeer-herding family of Klavdiya Grigoryevna Matryohkina and Vladimir Mikhailovich Matryokhin. Her mother was from a Sámi family of hunters and her father was Russian, from a family of Orthodox priests from Lovozero. Her younger sister Iraida Vinogradova is famous as a poet in her own right.  Her other younger sister is the linguist T. V. Matryokhina.

In 1958, Matryokhina graduated from the A. I. Herzen Leningrad State Pedagogical Institute. While still a student at the Pedagogical Institute, she went on linguistic expeditions to the Kola Peninsula, along with G. M. Kert and other fellow students.

After graduating, she taught Russian language and literature at a school in Lovozero while also being enrolled in graduate school at the Research Institute of National Schools. She completed her classes by correspondence, graduating from the institute in 1980. Around this time, she married Vyacheslav Voronov, whom she had met in Leningrad. In 1985, the couple moved to Revda and Voronova started work as a librarian at the Central Library of Revda where she worked until 1990.

Death
Voronova died on 16 June 1990 at the age of 55. She is buried in Lovozero.

Honors 
In 1995, the Voronova Museum of Sámi Literature and Writing was founded. In 2006, the Voronova Prize was created.

Bibliography 
 Снежница (translated into Russian by the poet Vladimir Smirnov). – Murmansk, 1986.
 Вольная птица (translated into Russian by the poet Vladimir Smirnov). – Murmansk, 1987.
 Чахкли (translated into Russian by the poets Stanislav Dorokhov and Vladimir Smirnov). – Murmansk, 1988.
 Я̄лла (in Ter Sámi with translations in Russian). – Murmansk, 1991.

Posthumous works:

 Поле жизни. — Murmansk, 1995.
 Тайна Бабьего суда. — St. Petersburg, 1995.
 Хочу остаться на земле. — Murmansk, 1995.

Scientific contributions:

 «Образцы диалектных текстов (Саамский язык)» (together with M. K. Grigoryevna and T. V. Matryokhina) // Прибалтийско-финское языкознание. Выпуск 5. Вопросы взаимодействия Прибалтийско-Финских языков с иностемными языками. К 80-летию со дня рождения Д. В. Бубриха. — Leningrad, 1971. pp. 158–166.
 Саамский язык: учебник и книга для чтения для 2-го класса (together with A. A. Antonova and E. N. Korkina). — Leningrad, 1990.

References

Further reading 
 Rießler, Michael (2018). "Kola Sámi literature (Kildin Sámi, Ter Sámi, Akkala Sámi)". In: "Čálli giehta olla guhkás" A writing hand reaches further ({S}ámi proverb) Johanna Domokos (ed.). Helsinki: Yhdenvertaisen kulttuurin puolesta ry, pp. 73–78.
 Sergejeva, Jelena (1995). "Oktjabrina Voronova. The first Kola Sami writer". In: On the terms of Northern women. Articles written by women researchers in Finland, Russia, Samiland and Sweden. Sinikka Tuohimaa, Nina Työlahti, and Asbjörg Fyhn (eds.). Oulu: Oulun yliopisto, pp. 148–152.

1934 births
1990 deaths
People from Lovozersky District
Sámi-language poets
Russian women poets
20th-century Russian poets
20th-century Russian women writers
Herzen University alumni